The Ainsty Bounds Walk is a 44-mile (71 km) long-distance footpath mostly in North Yorkshire, England, with a short section in West Yorkshire.  It follows the boundaries of the ancient wapentake of The Ainsty, between the rivers Wharfe, Nidd and Ouse, and passes through the towns of Boston Spa, Wetherby, Moor Monkton, the outskirts of York, and Bolton Percy.  As a circular walk it can be walked from any point, but it is considered to start and finish at Tadcaster.

References

Further reading

External links
Long Distance Walkers Association: Ainsty Bounds Walk

Footpaths in North Yorkshire
Long-distance footpaths in England